Lugal-Anne-Mundu (ca. 24th century BC) was the most important king of the city-state of Adab in Sumer.  The Sumerian king list claims he reigned for 90 years, following the defeat of Mesh-ki-ang-Nanna II, son of Nanni, of Ur. There are few authentic contemporary inscriptions for Lugal-Anne-Mundu's reign; he is known mainly from a much later text, purporting to be copied from one of his inscriptions.

His empire, perhaps the first in recorded history, collapsed upon his death. Following this, the king list indicates that the "kingship" (i.e. the Nippur-based hegemony) fell to a dynasty from Mari, beginning with Anbu; however, it has been suggested that more likely, only the last of these Mari kings, Sharrumiter, held the hegemony after Lugal-Anne-Mundu.  With the break-up of the Adab kingdom, other prominent cities appear to have concurrently regained their independence, including Lagash (Lugalanda), Akshak (which not long afterward won the kingship from Mari, perhaps under Puzur-Nirah), and Umma (whose king Lugal-zage-si eventually went on to seize his own empire throughout the Fertile Crescent).

Sumerian King List
Lugal-Anne-Mundu is mentioned in the Sumerian King List is some detail, although slightly fragmentarily. His rule is said to have followed that of Ur, but he was finally vanquished by the city-state of Mari:

The "Lugal-Anne-Mundu Inscription"
According to the fragmentary inscription attributed to Lugal-Anne-Mundu, (but known only from two copies dated from the reigns of Abi-Eshuh and Ammi-Saduqa in the 17th century BCE), he subjugated the "Four Quarters of the world" — i.e., the entire Fertile Crescent region, from the Mediterranean to the Zagros Mountains: 

His empire is said to have included the provinces of Elam, Marhashi, Gutium, Subartu, the "Cedar Mountain land" (Lebanon), Amurru or Martu, "Sutium" (?), and the "Mountain of E-anna" (Uruk with its ziggurat?). According to the inscription, he "made the people of all the lands live in peace as in a meadow".

He also mentions having confronted a coalition of 13 rebel governors or chiefs, led by Migir-Enlil of Marhashi; all of their names are considered Semitic.

Arno Poebel published a preliminary translation of one of the fragments in 1909, although he was unable to make out the king's name, which he rendered as "Lugal[.....]ni-mungin". Hans Gustav Güterbock published a more complete translation in 1934, but quickly dismissed the account as pseudepigraphic and largely fictional.  However, some more recent Sumerologists, following Samuel Kramer, have been more willing to give it credence as possibly a late copy of an actual inscription of Lugal-Anne-Mundu.

See also

History of Sumer

Notes

Sumerian kings
24th-century BC Sumerian kings
Kings of Adab